Several groups of tetrapods have undergone secondary aquatic adaptation, an evolutionary transition from being purely terrestrial to living at least part of the time in water. These animals are called "secondarily aquatic" because although their ancestors lived on land for hundreds of millions of years, they all originally descended from aquatic animals (see Evolution of tetrapods). These ancestral tetrapods had never left the water, and were thus primarily aquatic, like modern fishes. Secondary aquatic adaptations tend to develop in early speciation as the animal ventures into water in order to find available food. As successive generations spend more time in the water, natural selection causes the acquisition of more adaptations. Animals of later generations may spend the majority of their life in the water, coming ashore for mating. Finally, fully adapted animals may take to mating and birthing in water or ice.

Anapsid

Archelon is a type of giant sea turtle dating from the Cretaceous Period, now long extinct.  Its smaller cousins survive as the sea turtles of today.

Mesosaurus (and other mesosaurids) were another group of anapsid reptiles to secondarily return to the sea, eschewing shells, and are also long extinct.

Diapsid

Living at the same time as, but not closely related to, dinosaurs, the mosasaurs resembled crocodiles but were more strongly adapted to marine life. They became extinct 66 million years ago, at the same time as the dinosaurs. 

Modern diapsids which have made their own adaptions to allow them to spend significant time in the water include marine iguanas and marine crocodiles. Sea snakes are extensively adapted to the marine environment, giving birth to live offspring in the same way as the Euryapsida (see below) and are largely incapable of terrestrial activity.  The arc of their adaptation is evident by observing the primitive Laticauda genus, which must return to land to lay eggs.

Euryapsida

These marine reptiles had ancestors who moved back into the oceans. In the case of ichthyosaurs adapting as fully as the dolphins they superficially resemble, even giving birth to live offspring instead of laying eggs. Euryapsida is now no longer considered a valid taxonomic group (Motani, 2009).

Cetacea

During the Paleocene Epoch (about 66 - 55 million years ago), the ancient whale Pakicetus began pursuing an amphibious lifestyle in rivers or shallow seas. It was the ancestor of modern whales, dolphins, and porpoises. The cetacea are extensively adapted to marine life and cannot survive on land at all. Their adaptation can be seen in many unique physiognomic characteristics such as the dorsal blowhole, baleen teeth, and the cranial 'melon' organ used for aquatic echolocation. The closest extant terrestrial relative to the whale is the hippopotamus, which spends much of its time in the water and whose name literally means "horse of the river".

Sirenians

The ancestors of the dugong and manatees first appeared in the fossil record about 45 to 50 million years ago in the ocean.

Pinnipeds

The fossil records show that phocids existed 12 to 15 million years ago, and odobenids about 14 million years ago. Their common ancestor must have existed even earlier than that.

Polar bears

Although polar bears spend most of their time on the ice rather than in the water, polar bears show the beginnings of aquatic adaptation to swimming (high levels of body fat and nostrils that are able to close), diving, and thermoregulation. Distinctly polar bear fossils can be dated to about 100,000 years ago. The polar bear has thick fur and layers of fat on its body to protect it from the cold.

Speculative theories

Humans

Proponents of the aquatic ape hypothesis believe that part of human evolution includes some aquatic adaptation, which has been said to explain human hairlessness, bipedalism, increased subcutaneous fat, descended larynx, vernix caseosa, a hooded nose and various other physiological and anatomical changes. The idea is not accepted by most scholars who study human evolution.

See also 
Related topics
 Fin and flipper locomotion
 Tradeoffs for locomotion in air and water
 Evolution of cetaceans
 Vertebrate land invasion

Lists
 List of marine mammal species
 List of marine reptiles

References

Aquatic organisms
Biological evolution